Sky 2 is the second album by English/Australian instrumental progressive rock band Sky, released in 1980.  Despite being a double album it reached number one in the British Album charts, and at the time was the fastest double album to receive platinum status in the UK, while the instrumental single "Toccata" peaked at 5 in the British Singles Chart. The album was released in the United States and Canada as Sky (not to be confused with the band's debut album of that name), becoming the group's first and highest-charting entry on the Billboard 200.

Francis Monkman played guitar on the 20-minute rock suite "FIFO" because, in his words, "I felt it necessary to inject a grunge element". "FIFO" stands for "First In, First Out", and is a piece about computer processing.

The track "Tuba Smarties" is a light-hearted piece composed and played on tuba by bassist Herbie Flowers, and commonly played during the band's live show as a humorous encore. It is named after Smarties chocolate candies, by Rowntree's, which at the time were virtually unknown outside of Europe.

The track "Vivaldi", is Sky's own version of an earlier track by fellow progressive rock band Curved Air, of which Monkman was formerly a member. It originally appeared on their 1970 album "Air Conditioning".

Track listing

Original vinyl / 1980 Spanish cassette

1980 UK cassette (ZC SKY2)

1992 Freestyle Records CD (SKY CD 2) 

This version omits "Gavotte & Variations" and "Andante" from the original album.

1992 Music Club CD (MCCD 078) & 1994 Nota Blu CD (9403201)

This version contains all tracks from the original album, although "Scipio" has been faded out early, omitting some repeats, in order to fit the album onto one CD.

1992 & 1993 Success CDs (22620CD / 16031CD)

Largely follows the track list of the 1992 Freestyle Records CD, except all movements of "FIFO" are combined into one track, and some track lengths are slightly different.

1994 Merlin Records CD

Almost the same as the Success pressings, except for some minor track length differences, and the fact that the early fade edit of "Scipio" from the Music Club issue has been used. The Merlin Records cassette, released at the same time as this CD, however, contains the full album in its original track order, albeit still with the edited version of "Scipio" ("Tuba Smarties" is the last track on side one and "Ballet-Volta" is the first track on side two).

2005 Castle Music CD (CMRCD1087)

This version contains all album tracks, including the full length version of "Scipio". However, "Gavotte & Variations" has been edited to omit the final variation instead.

2014 Esoteric Recordings CD & DVD

The CD in this version is sourced from the masters of the 2005 Castle reissue and as such contains the same edited version of "Gavotte & Variations".

Personnel
 John Williams – classical guitars
 Francis Monkman – keyboards, synthesizers, harpsichord, piano, left-hand channel electric guitar on "FIFO"
 Herbie Flowers – bass guitar, tuba on "Tuba Smarties"
 Tristan Fry – drums, tuned percussion on "Tristan's Magic Garden" (drumkit, vibraphone, marimba, bass marimba, tympani & xylophones), trumpet on "Tuba Smarties"
 Kevin Peek – electric and classical guitars

Charts

Weekly charts

Year-end charts

Certifications

References

1980 albums
Arista Records albums
Ariola Records albums
Sky (English/Australian band) albums